Echinostomatidae is a family of trematodes in the order Plagiorchiida, first described in 1899.

Subdivisions
The World Register of Marine Species currently shows a total of 33 genera accepted within Echinostomatidae, subdivided across eight subfamilies, with five genera unplaced.

 Echinostomatinae Looss, 1899 
 Bashkirovitrema Skrjabin, 1944
 Drepanocephalus Dietz, 1909
 Echinodollfusia Skrjabin & Baschkirova, 1956
 Echinoparyphium Dietz, 1909
 Echinostoma Rudolphi, 1809
 Edietziana Ozdikmen, 2013
 Euparyphium Dietz, 1909
 Hypoderaeum Dietz, 1909
 Isthmiophora Lühe, 1909
 Kostadinovatrema Dronen, 2009
 Longicollia Bychovskaja-Pavlovskaja, 1953
 Lyperorchis Travassos, 1921
 Moliniella Hübner, 1939
 Neoacanthoparyphium Yamaguti, 1958
 Pameileenia Wright & Smithers, 1956
 Parallelotestis Belopolskaya, 1954
 Petasiger Dietz, 1909
 Prionosomoides Teixeira de Freitas & Dobbin, 1967
 Singhia Yamaguti, 1958
 Guaicapuriinae Nasir, Diaz & Marcano, 1971
 Guaicaipuria Nasir, Diaz & Marcano, 1971
 Protechinostoma Beaver, 1943
 Ignaviinae Yamaguti, 1958
 Ignavia Teixeira de Freitas, 1948
 Nephrostominae Mendheim, 1943
 Nephrostomum Dietz, 1909
 Patagifer Dietz, 1909
 Pegosominae Odhner, 1910
 Pegosomum Ratz, 1903
 Pelmatostominae Yamaguti, 1958
 Pelmatostomum Dietz, 1909
 Ruffetrematinae Kostadinova, 2005
 Ruffetrema Saxena & Singh, 1982
 Sodalinae Skrjabin & Schulz, 1937
 Sodalis Kowalewski, 1902
 Echinostomatidae unplaced genera
 Cathaemasia Looss, 189
 Neopetasiger Baschkirova, 1941
 Pseudocathaemasioides Saito & Fukumoto, 1972
 Pulchrosoma Travassos, 1916
 Skrjabinophora Baschkirova, 1941

References

Plagiorchiida